The Prix Ars Electronica is one of the best known and longest running yearly prizes in the field of electronic and interactive art, computer animation, digital culture and music. It has been awarded since 1987 by Ars Electronica (Linz, Austria).

In 2005, the Golden Nica, the highest prize, was awarded in six categories: "Computer Animation/Visual Effects," "Digital Musics," "Interactive Art," "Net Vision," "Digital Communities" and the "u19" award for "freestyle computing." Each Golden Nica came with a prize of €10,000, apart from the u19 category, where the prize was €5,000. In each category, there are also Awards of Distinction and Honorary Mentions.
The Golden Nica is replica of the Greek Nike of Samothrace. It is a handmade wooden statuette, plated with gold, so each trophy is unique: approximately 35 cm high, with a wingspan of about 20 cm, all on a pedestal. "Prix Ars Electronica" is a phrase composed of French, Latin and Spanish words, loosely translated as "Electronic Arts Prize."

Golden Nica winners

Computer animation / film / vfx

The "Computer Graphics" category (1987–1994) was open to different kinds of computer images. The "Computer Animation" (1987–1997) was replaced by the current "Computer Animation/Visual Effects" category in 1998.

Computer Graphics
1987 – Figur10 by Brian Reffin Smith, UK
1988 – The Battle by David Sherwin, US
1989 – Gramophone by Tamás Waliczky, HU
1990 – P-411-A by Manfred Mohr, Germany
1991 – Having encountered Eve for the second time, Adam begins to speak by Bill Woodard, US
1992 – RD Texture Buttons by Michael Kass and Andrew Witkin, US
1993 – Founders Series by Michael Tolson, US
1994 – Jellylife / Jellycycle / Jelly Locomotion by Michael Joaquin Grey, US

Computer Animation
1987 – Luxo Jr. by John Lasseter, US
1988 – Red's Dream by John Lasseter, US
1989 – Broken Heart by Joan Staveley, US
1990 – Footprint by Mario Sasso and Nicola Sani, IT
1991 – Panspermia by Karl Sims, US
1992 – Liquid Selves / Primordial Dance by Karl Sims, US
1993 – Lakmé by Pascal Roulin, BE
1994 – Jurassic Park by Dennis Muren, Mark Dippé and Steve Williams, US/CA
Distinction: Quarxs by Maurice Benayoun, FR
Distinction: K.O. Kid by Marc Caro, FR
1995 – God's Little Monkey by David Atherton and Bob Sabiston, US
1996 – Toy Story by John Lasseter, Lee Unkrich and Ralph Eggleston, US
1997 – Dragonheart by Scott Squires, Industrial Light & Magic (ILM), US

Computer Animation/Visual Effects

1998 – The Sitter by Liang-Yuan Wang, TW
Titanic by Robert Legato and Digital Domain, US
1999 – Bunny by Chris Wedge, US
What Dreams May Come by Mass Illusions, POP, Digital Domain, Vincent Ward, Stephen Simon and Barnet Bain, US
2000 – Maly Milos by Jakub Pistecky, CA
Maaz by Christian Volckman, FR
2001 – Le Processus by Xavier de l’Hermuzičre and Philippe Grammaticopoulos, FR
2002 – Monsters, Inc. by Andrew Stanton, Lee Unkrich, Pete Docter and David Silverman, US
2003 – Tim Tom by Romain Segaud and Cristel Pougeoise, FR
2004 – Ryan by Chris Landreth, US.
Distinction: Parenthèse from Francois Blondeau, Thibault Deloof, Jérémie Droulers, Christophe Stampe, France
Distinction: Birthday Boy from Sejong Park, Australia
2005 – Fallen Art by Tomek Baginski, Poland.
Distinction: The Incredibles from Pixar
Distinction: City Paradise by Gaëlle Denis (UK), Passion Pictures (FR)
2006 – 458nm by Jan Bitzer, Ilija Brunck, Tom Weber, Filmakademie Baden-Württemberg, Germany.
Distinction: Kein platz Für Gerold by Daniel Nocke / Studio Film Bilder, Germany
Distinction: Negadon, the monster from Mars, by Jun Awazu, Japan
2007 – Codehunters by Ben Hibon, (UK)
2008 – Madame Tutli-Putli by Chris Lavis, Maciek Szczerbowski. (Directors), Jason Walker (Special Visual Effects), National Film Board of Canada
2009 – HA'Aki by Iriz Pääbo, National Film Board of Canada
2010 – Nuit Blanche by Arev Manoukian (Director), Marc-André Gray (Visual Effects Artist), National Film Board of Canada
2011 – Metachaos by Alessandro Bavari (IT)
2012 – Rear Window Loop by Jeff Desom (LU)
Distinction: Caldera by Evan Viera/Orchid Animation (US)
Distinction: Rise of the Planet of the Apes by Weta Digital (NZ)/Twentieth Century Fox
2013 – Forms by Quayola (IT), Memo Akten (TR)
Distinction: Duku Spacemarines by La Mécanique du Plastique (FR)
Distinction: Oh Willy… by Emma De Swaef (BE), Marc James Roels (BE) / Beast Animation
2014 – Walking City by Universal Everything (UK)
2015 – Temps Mort by Alex Verhaest (BE)
Distinction: Bär by Pascal Floerks (DE)
Distinction: The Reflection of Power by Mihai Grecu (RO/HU)

Digital Music
This category is for those making electronic music and sound art through digital means. From 1987 to 1998 the category was known as "Computer music." Two Golden Nicas were awarded in 1987, and none in 1990. There was no Computer Music category in 1991.

1987 – Peter Gabriel and Jean-Claude Risset
1988 – Denis Smalley
1989 – Kaija Saariaho
1990 – None
1991 – Category omitted
1992 – Alejandro Viñao
1993 – Bernard Parmegiani
1994 – Ludger Brümmer
1995 – Trevor Wishart
1996 – Robert Normandeau
1997 – Matt Heckert
1998 – Peter Bosch and Simone Simons (joint award)
1999 – Come to Daddy by Aphex Twin (Richard D. James) and Chris Cunningham (joint award)
 Distinction: Birthdays by Ikue Mori (JP)
 Distinction: Mego (label), Hotel Paral.lel by Christian Fennesz, Seven Tons For Free by Peter Rehberg (a.k.a. Pita)
2000 – 20' to 2000 by Carsten Nicolai
Distinction: Minidisc by Gescom
Distinction: Outside the Circle of Fire by Chris Watson
2001 – Matrix by Ryoji Ikeda
2002 – Man'yo Wounded 2001 by Yasunao Tone
2003 – Ami Yoshida, Sachiko M and Utah Kawasaki (joint award)
2004 – Banlieue du Vide by Thomas Köner
2005 – TEO! A Sonic Sculpture by Maryanne Amacher
2006 – L'île ré-sonante by Eliane Radigue
2007 – Reverse-Simulation Music by Mashiro Miwa
2008 – Reactable by Sergi Jordà (ES), Martin Kaltenbrunner (AT), Günter Geiger (AT) and Marcos Alonso (ES)
2009 – Speeds of Time versions 1 and 2 by Bill Fontana (US)
2010 – rheo: 5 horizons by Ryoichi Kurokawa (JP)
2011 – Energy Field by Jana Winderen (NO)
2012 –  "Crystal Sounds of a Synchrotron" by Jo Thomas (GB)
2013 – frequencies (a) by Nicolas Bernier (CA)
 Distinction: SjQ++ by SjQ++ (JP)
 Distinction: Borderlands Granular by Chris Carlson (US)
2015 – Chijikinkutsu by Nelo Akamatsu (JP)
 Distinction: Drumming is an elastic concept by Josef Klammer (AT)
 Distinction: Under Way by Douglas Henderson (DE)
2017 – Not Your World Music: Noise In South East Asia by Cedrik Fermont (CD/BE/DE), Dimitri della Faille (BE/CA)
 Distinction: Gamelan Wizard by Lucas Abela (AU), Wukir Suryadi (ID) und Rully Shabara (ID)
 Distinction: Corpus Nil by Marco Donnarumma (DE/IT)

Hybrid art

2007 – SymbioticaSymbiotica
2008 – Pollstream – Nuage Vert by Helen Evans (FR/UK) and Heiko Hansen (FR/DE) HeHe
2009 – Natural History of the Enigma by Eduardo Kac (US)
2010 – Ear on Arm by Stelarc (AU)
2011 – May the Horse Live in me by Art Orienté Objet (FR)
2012 – Bacterial radio by Joe Davis (US)
2013 – Cosmopolitan Chicken Project, Koen Vanmechelen (BE)
2015 – Plantas Autofotosintéticas, Gilberto Esparza (MX)
2017 – K-9_topology, Maja Smrekar (SI)

[the next idea] voestalpine Art and Technology Grant
2009 – Open_Sailing by Open_Sailing Crew led by Cesar Harada.
2010 – Hostage by [Frederik De Wilde].
2011 – Choke Point Project by P2P Foundation (NL).
2012 – qaul.net – tools for the next revolution by Christoph Wachter & Mathias Jud
2013 – Hyperform by Marcelo Coelho (BR), Skylar Tibbits (US), Natan Linder (IL), Yoav Reaches (IL)
 Honorary Mentions: GravityLight by Martin Riddiford (GB), Jim Reeves (GB)
  2014 – BlindMaps by Markus Schmeiduch, Andrew Spitz and Ruben van der Vleuten
  2015 – SOYA C(O)U(L)TURE by XXLab (ID) – Irene Agrivina Widyaningrum, Asa Rahmana, Ratna Djuwita, Eka Jayani Ayuningtias, Atinna Rizqiana

Interactive Art

Prizes in the category of interactive art have been awarded since 1990. This category applies to many categories of works, including installations and performances, characterized by audience participation, virtual reality, multimedia and telecommunication.

1990 – Videoplace installation by Myron Krueger
1991 – Think About the People Now project by Paul Sermon
1992 – Home of the Brain installation by Monika Fleischmann and Wolfgang Strauss
1993 – Simulationsraum-Mosaik mobiler Datenklänge (smdk) installation by Knowbotic Research
1994 – A-Volve environment by Christa Sommerer and Laurent Mignonneau
1995 – the concept of Hypertext, attributed to Tim Berners-Lee
1996 – Global Interior Project installation by Masaki Fujihata
1997 – Music Plays Images X Images Play Music concert by Ryuichi Sakamoto and Toshio Iwai
1998 – World Skin, a Photo Safari in the Land of War installation by Jean-Baptiste Barrière and Maurice Benayoun
1999 – Difference Engine #3 by construct and Lynn Hershman
2000 – Vectorial Elevation, Relational Architecture #4 installation by Rafael Lozano-Hemmer
2001 – polar installation by Carsten Nicolai and Marko Peljhan
2002 – n-cha(n)t installation by David Rokeby
2003 – Can You See Me Now? participatory game by Blast Theory and Mixed Reality Lab
2004 – Listening Post installation by Ben Rubin and Mark Hansen
2005 – MILKproject installation and project by Esther Polak, Ieva Auzina and RIXC – Riga Centre for New Media Culture
2006 – The Messenger installation by Paul DeMarinis
2007 – Park View Hotel installation by Ashok Sukumaran
2008 – Image Fulgurator by Julius von Bismarck (Germany)
2009 – Nemo Observatorium by Laurence Malstaf (Belgium)
2010 – The Eyewriter by Zachary Lieberman, Evan Roth, James Powderly, Theo Watson, Chris Sugrue, Tempt1
2011 – Newstweek by Julian Oliver (NZ) and Danja Vasiliev (RU)
2012 – Memopol-2 by Timo Toots (EE)
2013 – Pendulum Choir By Michel Décosterd (CH), André Décosterd (CH)
 Distinction – Rain Room by rAndom International (GB)
 Distinction – Voices of Aliveness by Masaki Fujihata (JP)
2014 – Loophole for All by Paolo Cirio(IT)
2016 – Can you hear me? by Mathias Jud(DE), Christoph Wachter (CH)

Internet-related categories

In the categories "World Wide Web" (1995–96) and ".net" (1997–2000), interesting web-based projects were awarded, based on criteria like web-specificity, community-orientation, identity and interactivity. In 2001, the category became broader under the new name "Net Vision / Net Excellence", with rewards for innovation in the online medium.

World Wide Web

1995 – Idea Futures by Robin Hanson
1996 – Digital Hijack by etoy
 Second prizes: HyGrid by SITO and Journey as an exile

.net

1997 – Sensorium by Taos Project
1998 – IO_Dencies Questioning Urbanity by Knowbotic Research
1999 – Linux by Linus Torvalds
2000 – In the Beginning... Was the Command Line (excerpts) by Neal Stephenson

Net Vision / Net Excellence

2001 – Banja by Team cHmAn and "PrayStation" by Joshua Davis
2002 – Carnivore by Radical Software Group and "They Rule" by Josh On and Futurefarmers
2003 – Habbo Hotel and Noderunner by Yury Gitman and Carlos J. Gomez de Llarena
2004 – Creative Commons
2005 – Processing by Benjamin Fry, Casey Reas and the Processing community
2006 – The Road Movie by exonemo

Digital Communities

A category begun in 2004 with support from SAP (and a separate ceremony in New York City two months before the main Ars Electronica ceremony) to celebrate the 25th birthday of Ars Electronica. Two Golden Nicas were awarded.

2004 – Wikipedia and The World Starts With Me
Distinction:
 Open-Clothes
2005 – Akshaya, an information technology development program in India
Distinction: Free Software Foundation (USA) and Telestreet – NewGlobalVision (Italy)
2006 – canal*ACCESSIBLE
Distinction:
 Codecheck (Roman Bleichenbacher CH)
 Proyecto Cyberela – Radio Telecentros (CEMINA)
Honorary Mentions:
 Arduino (Arduino)
 Charter97.org – News from Belarus
 CodeTree
 MetaReciclagem
 Mountain Forum
 Northfield.org
 Pambazuka News (Fahamu
 Semapedia
 stencilboard.at (Stefan Eibelwimmer (AT), Günther Kolar (AT))
 The Freecycle Network
 The Organic City
 UgaBYTES Initiative (UgaBYTES Initiative (UG))
2007 – Overmundo
2008 – 1 kg more
Distinction: PatientsLikeMe and Global Voices Online
2009 – HiperBarrio by Álvaro Ramírez and Gabriel Jaime Vanegas
Distinction:
 piratbyran.org
 wikileaks.org
Honorary Mentions:
 hackmeeting.org
 pad.ma
 Maneno
 femalepressure.net
 metamute.org
 ubu.com
 canchas.org 
 feraltrade.org
 flossmanuals.net
 wikiartpedia.org
 changemakers.net
 vocesbolivianas.org
 2010 – Chaos Computer Club
 2011 – Fundacion Ciudadano Inteligente
 Distinction:
 Bentham Papers Transcription Initiative (Transcribe Bentham) (UK). See also the project's Transcription Desk
 X_MSG
 2012 – Syrian people know their way
 2013 – El Campo de Cebada by El Campo de Cebada (ES)
 Distinction: Refugees United by Christopher Mikkelsen (DK), David Mikkelsen (DK)
 Distinction: Visualizing Palestine by Visualizing Palestine (PS)
 2014 –  Project Fumbaro Eastern Japan by Takeo Saijo (JP)

See also

 List of computer-related awards

References

External links

 
 ARS ELECTRONICA ARCHIVE - PRIX
 Past winners
 Past winners (in german, more detailed)
 Prix Ars Electronica 1987–1990 

Awards established in 1987
Arts awards in Austria
Animation awards
Computer-related awards
Digital media
New media art festivals